Tom Meadows may refer to:

Tom Meadows, character in 31 North 62 East
Tom Meadows (boxer), see Paddy Duffy
Tom Meadows (coach), see Ron Balicki
Thomas Meadows, Freight forwarder